Vizioz is a French family name. It may refer to:
 Gautier Vizioz, French record producer, songwriter and musician
 Dean Henri Vizioz, co-founder of the University of Pau and Pays de l'Adour in France
 "Vizioz", a song from the album Orelsan et Gringe sont les Casseurs Flowters by French hip hop duo Casseurs Flowters